George Dodd may refer to:

 George Dodd (jockey) (1863–1881), Australian jockey, correct name John Dodd
 George Dodd (MP) (circa 1800 – 1864), English member of Parliament for Maidstone
 George Dodd (19th-century writer) (1808–1881), English journalist
 George Dodd (Australian writer) (active since 1990), Australian comedy writer
 George A. Dodd (1852–1925), United States Army general
 George H. Dodd, perfumer
 George Dodd (tennis) (1883–1957), South African tennis player

See also
George Dodds (1889–1977), British politician